David Bailey (born 1938) is an English photographer.

David Bailey may also refer to:

In arts and media
 David Bailey (actor) (1933–2004), American actor
 David M. Bailey (1966–2010), Christian singer-songwriter
 Dave Bailey (musician) (born 1926), American jazz drummer
 David A. Bailey (born 1961), British Afro-Caribbean curator, photographer and writer
 David Bailey (writer), British editor and science fiction author
 Dave Hullfish Bailey, American sculptor

In sport
 David Bailey (motorcyclist) (born 1961), American racer
 Homer Bailey (David Dewitt Bailey, Jr., born 1986), baseball player
 David Bailey (rugby league) (born 1969), New Zealand rugby league footballer
 David Bailey (cricketer, born 1943), English cricketer
 David Bailey (cricketer, born 1944), English cricketer
 David Bailey (basketball) (born 1981), American basketball player

In other fields
 David Bailey (economist) (born 1966), British academic and commentator
 David H. Bailey (mathematician) (born 1948), mathematician and computer scientist
 David Bailey (diplomat) (1830–1896), US Consul and Consul General in China
 David Jackson Bailey (1812–1897), American politician
 David Bailey (militia officer) (1801–1854), American militia officer in the Illinois Militia
 David Bailey (priest) (born 1952), Archdeacon of Bolton
 David Bailey (pharmacologist) (1945–2022), Canadian distance runner and medical researcher
 David Earle Bailey (born 1940), bishop in the Episcopal Church

Fictional characters
 Lieutenant Dave Bailey, a character in the Star Trek episode "The Corbomite Maneuver"

See also  
 David Bailly (1584–1657), Dutch Golden Age painter
 David Baillie (disambiguation)